Events in the year 1939 in Norway.

Incumbents
 Monarch – Haakon VII
 Prime Minister – Johan Nygaardsvold (Labour Party)

Events

17 May – Sweden, Norway, and Finland refuse Germany's offer of non-aggression pacts.
1 June – Oslo Airport, Fornebu is opened.
1 June – Kristiansand Airport, Kjevik is officially opened.
1 September – Norway, Finland, Sweden and Switzerland declare their neutrality.

Popular culture

Sports

Music

Film

Literature

Notable births
 
 

1 January – Lars Oftedal Broch, judge (died 2017)
8 January – Laila Kaland, politician (died 2007)
12 January – Dagfinn Ripnes, politician
13 January – Kari Wærness, sociologist.
15 January – Bjørn Hansen, soccer player and coach
17 January – Kari Knudsen, model
4 February – Ola Hunderi, physicist
5 February – Tor Bjerkmann, publisher (died 1999). 
13 February – Bjørn Bergvall, sailor and Olympic gold medallist
15 February – Ole Ellefsæter, cross country skier, double Olympic gold medallist and World Champion (died 2022).
16 February – Sigmund Borgundvåg, naval architect
21 February – Svein Erik Brodal, actor, theatre director, poet, novelist and politician.
8 March – Ole Danbolt Mjøs, physician and politician, leader of the Norwegian Nobel Committee
8 March – Per A. Utsi, politician
17 March – Lars Lefdal, politician
23 March – Hans Rasmus Astrup, ship broker, art collector, and founder of the Astrup Fearnley Museum of Modern Art (died 2021).
23 March – Jannik Lindbæk, businessperson
27 March – Per Ove Width, politician
4 April – Ragnhild Queseth Haarstad, politician and Minister
7 April – Kjell Kaspersen, international soccer player
14 April – Olaf Aurdal, politician
14 April – Dag Kavlie, shipping engineer
17 April – Jan Hoem, demographer
19 April – Solveig Sollie, politician and Minister
20 April – Gro Harlem Brundtland, Norway's first female Prime Minister
8 May – Tore A. Liltved, politician (died 2004)
17 May – Ola B. Johannessen, actor, stage producer and theatre director
23 May – Gunnar Breimo, politician
3 June – Jon Tolaas, poet and author (died 2012)
2 July – Monna Tandberg, actress.
4 July – Thea Stabell, actress
15 July – Eilert Stang Lund, judge
15 July – Ketil Lund, judge
21 July – Magnar Norderhaug, zoologist and ecologist (died 2006)
25 July – Arne L. Haugen, politician
29 July – Jon Istad, biathlete and World Champion
29 July – Georg Johan Jacobsen, politician
30 July – Syver Berge, politician
5 August – Nils Are Øritsland, polar researcher in zoophysiology and ecology (died 2006)
9 August – Odd Børre, pop singer
18 August – Harald Heide-Steen Jr. actor, comedian and singer (died 2008)
18 August – Georg Indrevik, politician
16 September – Jon Hellesnes, philosopher, novelist and essayist
19 September – Babben Enger-Damon, cross country skier, Olympic gold medallist and orienteer
23 September – Rolf Birger Pedersen, football player and coach (died 2001)
25 September – Berit Nøkleby, historian
26 September – Snøfrid Skaare, politician
26 September – Lars Jacob Krogh, journalist (died 2010)
1 October – Astrid Sandvik, alpine skier
2 October – Kristin K. Devold, politician
3 October – Anneliese Dørum, politician (died 2000)
16 October – Sverre Bergh Johansen, diplomat
16 October – Hans Fredrik Dahl, historian, journalist and professor
21 October – Kjell Borgen, politician and Minister (died 1996)
30 October – Gro Gulden, mycologist
16 November – Tor Åge Bringsværd, author, playwright, editor and translator
27 November – Erik Bartnes, farmer and politician
1 December – Halvdan Skard, politician
27 December – Olav Jordet, biathlete, Olympic silver medallist and World Champion

Notable deaths

22 January – Peder Østlund, speed skater (born 1872)
2 March – Einar Wang, politician (born 1855)
7 March – Bertrand Narvesen, businessperson (born 1860)
25 June – Olaf Ørvig, sailor and Olympic gold medallist (born 1889)
27 June – Mikal Angell Jacobus Landmark, politician (born 1867)
17 July – Oskar Braaten, novelist and playwright (born 1881)
13 September – Olav Duun, novelist (born 1876)
15 September – Jens Bratlie, politician and Prime Minister of Norway (born 1856)
8 October – Gustav Henriksen, businessperson (born 1872)
2 November – Eivind Heiberg, engineer and railway director (born 1870)
9 December – Nils Erik Flakstad, businessperson and politician (born 1876)
12 December – Olaf Amundsen, politician and Minister (born 1876)
14 December – Peter Torjesen, missionary to China (born 1892)
22 December – Østen Østensen, rifle shooter and Olympic silver medallist (born 1878)
29 December – Johannes Irgens, diplomat, politician and Minister (born 1869)

Full date unknown
Lars Jorde, painter (born 1865)
Elias C. Kiær, businessperson (born 1863)

See also

References

External links